A Camellia is a flower.

Camellia may also refer to:
 Camellia (cipher), a block cipher
 Camellia (poem), a poem by Rabindranath Tagore
 Redmi Note 10, a codename for Redmi Note 10 5G
 Camellia (company), British-owned group of agricultural companies
 Camellia, New South Wales, a suburb in Sydney, Australia
 USLHT Camellia, a United States lighthouse tender
 Camellia, a character in Arc the Lad: Twilight of the Spirits
 Camellia City, a nickname for Sacramento, California
 Camellia/かめりあ, a Japanese electronic music composer and producer.

See also
 Camelia (disambiguation)
 Camilla (disambiguation)
 Tsubaki (disambiguation), the Japanese word for Camellia